Eremophila cryptothrix is a flowering plant in the figwort family, Scrophulariaceae and is endemic to the Pilbara region of Western Australia. It is a shrub with sticky stems due to the presence of resin, narrow leaves, coloured sepals and white, pale pink or pale blue flowers.

Description

The petal tube is white, sometimes pale pink or pale blue with prominent brownish spots inside. The petal tube is mostly glabrous except that there are many club-shaped hairs inside, near the base of the tube. The 4 stamens are fully enclosed within the tube.

Taxonomy and naming
The species was first formally described by Robert Chinnock in 2007 and the description was published in Eremophila and Allied Genera: A Monograph of the Plant Family Myoporaceae. The specific epithet (cryptothrix) is from the Ancient Greek words κρυπτός (kruptós) meaning "hidden", "secret" or "concealed” and θρίξ (thríx) meaning "hair" referring to the hairs hidden in the resin coating the stems.

Distribution and habitat
Eremophila cryptothrix grows mostly on rocky hills between Ashburton Downs and the Barlee Range in the Pilbara and Gascoyne biogeographic regions.

Conservation status
Eremophila cryptothrix is classified as "not threatened" by the Government of Western Australia Department of Parks and Wildlife.

References

cryptothrix
Eudicots of Western Australia
Plants described in 2007
Endemic flora of Western Australia